Isopogon panduratus is a plant in the family Proteaceae and is endemic to the southwest of Western Australia. It is a spreading shrub with narrow egg-shaped leaves and spherical heads of pale pink flowers.

Description
The flowers are arranged in spherical, sessile heads about mostly forty to seventy pale pink flowers, the heads  in diameter, the heads with three to five whorls of involucral bracts at the base. Flowering mainly occurs from June to August or August to October, depending on subspecies.

Taxonomy and naming
Isopogon panduratus was first formally described in 2010 by Michael Clyde Hislop and Barbara Lynette Rye from specimens collected by Hislop in Tathra National Park in 2000. The specific epithet (panduratus) is a reference to the shape of the inner involucral bracts that of a pandura.

Hislop and Rye described two subspecies of I. panduratus and the names are accepted by the Australian Plant Census:

Distribution and habitat
Subspecies palustris grows in heath on the coastal plain between Cervantes and near Cataby and subspecies panduratus is found in heath, sometimes Banksia woodland from near Eneabba to Watheroo National Park.

References

panduratus
Eudicots of Western Australia
Plants described in 2010
Taxa named by Barbara Lynette Rye